Westfield Township is one of the seventeen townships of Medina County, Ohio, United States.  The 2000 census found 4,172 people in the township, 2,545 of whom lived in the unincorporated portions of the township.

Geography

Located in the southern part of the county, it borders the following townships:
Lafayette Township - north
Montville Township - northeast corner
Guilford Township - east
Milton Township, Wayne County - southeast corner
Canaan Township, Wayne County - south
Harrisville Township - west
Chatham Township - northwest corner

Two villages are located in Westfield Township:
Part of Creston, in the southeast
Westfield Center, in the center

Westfield Township also surrounds the township and village of Gloria Glens Park in the northeast corner of the township.

Name and history
Statewide, the only other Westfield Township is located in Morrow County.

Government
The township is governed by a three-member board of trustees, who are elected in November of odd-numbered years to a four-year term beginning on the following January 1. Two are elected in the year after the presidential election and one is elected in the year before it. There is also an elected township fiscal officer, who serves a four-year term beginning on April 1 of the year after the election, which is held in November of the year before the presidential election. Vacancies in the fiscal officership or on the board of trustees are filled by the remaining trustees.

References

External links
Township website
County website
Township History

Townships in Medina County, Ohio
Townships in Ohio